Shriram Pal (born Jalaun district, Uttar Pradesh  5 May  1960) is an Indian politician from Uttar Pradesh who belongs to the Samajwadi Party.

He was a member of the Rajya Sabha during 2009-2010 from Uttar Pradesh.

References

1960 births
Living people
Rajya Sabha members from Uttar Pradesh
People from Jalaun district
Samajwadi Party politicians from Uttar Pradesh